The 1982 Pacific hurricane season, with 23 named storms, ranks as the fourth-most active Pacific hurricane season on record, tied with 2018. It was at that time the most active season in the basin until it was later surpassed by the 1985 season. It officially started June 1, 1982, in the eastern Pacific, and June 1, 1982, in the central Pacific, and lasted until October 31, 1982, in the central Pacific and until November 15, 1982, in the Eastern Pacific. These dates conventionally delimit the period of each year when most tropical cyclones form in the northeastern Pacific Ocean. At that time, the season was considered as the most active season within the basin in terms of named storms, however, the 1985 season surpassed these numbers just three years later.

The 1982 season was an eventful one. Hurricane Paul killed over 1,000 people before it was named. Hurricanes Daniel and Gilma both briefly threatened Hawaii, while Hurricane Iwa caused heavy damage to Kauai and Niihau. The remnants of Hurricane Olivia brought heavy rain to a wide swath of the western United States.



Seasonal summary 

This season had twenty-three tropical storms, twelve hurricanes, and five major hurricanes. Three tropical storms and one hurricane— a record number of named storms— formed in the central Pacific. This was largely due to the strong 1982–83 El Niño event, which was present during the season. However, this was surpassed in the 2015 Pacific hurricane season with eight storms.

This is the first year that named storms forming between the dateline and 140°W were given names from the Hawaiian language. Previous to this year, names and numbers from the western Pacific's typhoon list were used. After this year, it was decided that the six-year lists would be used, instead of the four-year ones. That is why the 1978 season's list was used again this season.

Systems

Tropical Storm Aletta 

On May 20, the disturbance was upgraded into a tropical depression. Moving northwest, the depression became Tropical Storm Aletta 36 hours later. Shortly after its peak, Tropical Storm Aletta began to weaken. However, the system briefly leveled off in intensity for 30 hours before resuming a weakening trend. On May 25, Aletta slowed and moved in a large clockwise loop until May 28. Shortly thereafter, Tropical Storm Aletta was downgraded into a depression. Tropical Depression Aletta dissipated on May 29 roughly 180 mi (290 km/h) southwest of Acapulco.

Tropical Depression Two-E 

This system originated as a low in the western Caribbean on the morning of May 27. The next day it moved southwest into Guatemala with significant thunderstorm activity, emerging into the Gulf of Tehuantepec around noon on May 29. By May 31, it was organized enough to be considered a tropical depression. Slowly weakening on June 1 as it remained quasi-stationary, the system dissipated in the Gulf of Tehuantepec on June 4.

Tropical Depression Three-E 

This cyclone formed well to the west-southwest of Mexico on June 12. The depression slowly recurved due to an upper-level low located well to its north-northwest.

Tropical Storm Bud 

Drifting west-northwest, it quickly strengthened into a tropical storm. Maximum sustained winds peaked near  late on June 15.

Tropical Depression Five-E 

Late on June 16, deep convection organized in the Gulf of Tehuantepec into a tropical depression. Transcribing a small clockwise loop, the system moved west-northwest. Interaction with Mexico likely played a role in its weakening as water temperatures under the system were never below 82 °F (28 °C).

Tropical Storm Carlotta 

A tropical wave crossed Central America on June 26, creating an area of thunderstorms just inside the tropical eastern Pacific that morning. Slowly turning northwest, the system was upgraded to a tropical depression early on July 1 and a tropical storm by nightfall. Increasingly southwest flow aloft turned Carlotta more northward into cooler waters, causing the cyclone to regain tropical depression status on the evening of July 4, ultimately dissipating southwest of Cabo San Lucas the next evening.

Tropical Depression Seven-E 

The system formed between Tropical Storm Carlotta and the Hawaiian Islands on the evening of July 2.

Hurricane Daniel 

Tropical Depression Eight-E formed south of Mexico on July 7. Moving west-northwest, the cyclone slowly strengthened into a tropical storm around noon on July 8 before becoming a hurricane late in the afternoon of July 9. Daniel reached its maximum intensity of  early in the morning of July 11 a few hundred miles southwest of Manzanillo, Mexico. As the storm moved westward, it slowly weakened. Daniel regained tropical storm status during the night of July 14, entering the Central Pacific Basin as a weakening tropical storm on the morning of July 16. Daniel turned northward, and on July 22, dissipated in the Alenuihaha Channel between Maui and the Big Island of Hawaii.

Tropical Storm Emilia 

Tropical Depression Nine-E developed near 10.0° N 136.5° W on the morning of July 12. Intensifying, the cyclone became a tropical storm later that day. An upper trough to the west weakened Emilia rapidly due to vertical wind shear, and the cyclone weakened to tropical depression status early on the morning of July 15. Dissipation of the tropical depression was noted by afternoon.

Tropical Depression Ten-E 

To the east of Daniel, a tropical depression formed on the evening of July 13 a few hundred miles west-southwest of Manzanillo.

Tropical Depression Eleven-E 

By the evening of July 15, cyclonic turning was evident and the system was upgraded to a tropical depression. Moving unsteadily to the west-northwest, the system weakened, dissipating a few hundred miles west-northwest of where it had formed.

Hurricane Fabio 

The cyclone developed as a tropical depression southeast of Manzanillo on July 17. Over the next couple of days, it strengthened rapidly into a hurricane as it moved northwest, peaking in intensity with  winds. Gradual weakening occurred as Fabio turned westward along the 19th parallel north into cooler waters, eventually dissipating late on July 24.

Hurricane Gilma 

Tropical Depression Thirteen-E formed near 9.5°N 117°30'W and moved slightly north of west. Tropical storm status was attained near noon on July 26, and the cyclone crossed the threshold of hurricane strength late on the night of July 27. By noon on July 29, Gilma reached it maximum intensity of  well to the east-southeast of Hawaii. The cyclone weakened and sped up its motion to the west-northwest, crossing into the Central Pacific Basin as a category one hurricane very early on July 30. The cyclone dissipated late on August 1 as it passed 200 mi (300 km) south of Kauai.

Hurricane Hector 

On July 23, a tropical wave moved off the Colombian coast. By the evening of July 27, the system slowed its forward motion. The next evening, a tropical depression organized within the thunderstorm activity well to the south of Baja California. Strengthening continued, as Hector became a tropical storm on the morning of July 29 and a hurricane by noon on July 30. A combination of vertical wind shear and cooler waters ahead of the cyclone led to its weakening trend, which hastened on August 1. It weakened to a tropical storm on the morning of August 2 and to a depression soon thereafter while located midway between the Hawaiian Islands and southern Baja California.

Tropical Storm Iva 

Moving west-northwest, it achieved tropical depression status that night and tropical storm status on August 2 while 800 mi (1,340 km) west-southwest of Acapulco. Northeasterly upper-level shear appears to have been Iva's nemesis, as the system weakened back into a tropical depression by the afternoon of August 3 as it turned west-southwest. The depression maintained strength for another several days before dissipating well east-southwest of Hilo, Hawaii, on the morning of August 8.

Hurricane John 

Tropical Depression Sixteen-E formed on August 3 in the East Pacific between Hawaii and Mexico. The system intensified into a tropical storm by noon August 4, and a hurricane on the morning of August 5. Weakening commenced on August 7 due to westerly vertical wind shear caused by the semi-permanent mid-oceanic upper trough, and John weakened to a tropical storm on the night of August 8.

Hurricane Kristy 

Tropical Depression Seventeen-E formed by noon on August 8 in the East Pacific. The low moved west, intensified, and became Tropical Storm Kristy by midnight, and a hurricane by midnight on the night of August 9. Weakening as it entered the Central Pacific, Kristy regained tropical storm status late on August 10 while moving south of due west at a rapid 30 mph (48 km/h). As it slowed down and turned northwest, Kristy began to restrengthen. Hurricane intensity was reached again on the evening of August 13. By noon on August 14, the cyclone passed 250 mi (400 km) south of South Point, Hawaii. Westerly winds aloft slowed Kristy's forward motion down additionally, and Kristy weakened back into a tropical storm on August 15. Turning more to the west with the low level wind flow, the cyclone was downgraded to a tropical depression by noon on August 16 and dissipated that night southwest of Hawaii.

Tropical Storm Lane 

The originating disturbance of this system emerged off San José, Costa Rica on August 4 and slowly consolidated. By the afternoon of August 8, Tropical Depression Eighteen-E developed well south of Cabo San Lucas. The next morning it had continued strengthening into a tropical storm. Maximum sustained winds reached 60 mph (97 km/h) as it continued moving west-northwest. Vertical wind shear reached Lane on August 10, which led to weakening. It weakened to a tropical depression late on August 11, but sporadic thunderstorm blowups near the center kept the system alive for another few days. Dissipation occurred on the evening of August 14 as it crossed the 140th meridian west.

Hurricane Miriam 

Tropical Depression Nineteen-E formed on August 29 a couple hundred miles southwest of Manzanillo, Mexico. The depression moved west-northwestward, intensifying into a tropical storm by noon on August 30 and a hurricane by noon on August 31. Peak intensity of 90 mph (145 km/h) was attained during the early morning of September 1. For the next couple of days, Miriam remained unchanged in strength. By late on September 3, a weakening trend was realized as it passed into the Central Pacific by the afternoon of September 4. Shearing apart soon afterwards, the low moved northwest and weakened into a tropical depression well to the east of Hawaii on the morning of September 5. It drifted north, and became a nontropical low by September 6. The cyclone was last noted near 30°N 149°W, continuing its northward trek.

Tropical Storm Akoni 

Tropical Depression One-C formed along the eastern end of the West Pacific monsoon trough on August 30 about 700 mi (1120 km) east of the International Dateline, well to the west-southwest of Hawaii. Moving slowly westward, the system intensified rapidly into a tropical storm by noon and was named Akoni. The name "Akoni" is an ʻokina-less spelling of ʻAkoni, which is Hawaiian for "Anthony". Maximum sustained winds increased to 60 mph (97 km/h) late on August 31 as Akoni moved near the ship Nana Lolo a few hundred miles east of the International Dateline. An upper trough to the northwest set Akoni on a weakening curve, and the cyclone diminished to a tropical depression on the evening of September 1 as it moved with the low level flow. The weakening depression passed the International Dateline into the western Pacific on the morning of September 2. Akoni was the first storm to receive a name from the modern Central Pacific tropical cyclone naming list.

Hurricane Norman 

Northeasterly shear slowed the development of the initial tropical depression which formed into Norman. Strengthening began in earnest on September 11, and the cyclone became a tropical storm, and then a hurricane by early on September 13. Maximum sustained winds reached nearly 95 mph (153 km/h) by September 15. A mid-latitude trough dug in from the north, weakening the ridge north of Norman and leading to a northward motion. Increased vertical wind shear and cooler waters weakened the hurricane, with dissipation occurring just west of Baja California on September 18. On September 17 and 18, moisture from Norman brought scattered rain to California and Arizona.

Tropical Depression Twenty-One-E 

A tropical depression formed well east-southeast of Hawaii late on September 10. Moving over cooler waters soon after formation, the depression dissipated by the next evening near 14°N 134°W.

Tropical Storm Ema 

An area of convection formed near 15°N 140°W and by September 15, a tropical depression had formed within the thunderstorm activity. Strengthening as it moved slowly north-northeast, the cyclone became a tropical storm late that day. Ema became stationary between the morning of September 16 and September 17 before resuming its north-northeast heading. Its peak intensity was 45 mph (72 km/h). Upper-level shear weakened the system into a tropical depression by noon on September 18. As it crossed the 140th meridian west back into the eastern Pacific near the 20th parallel north, the depression dissipated.

Tropical Storm Hana 

An area of thunderstorms stewed south of the Hawaiian Islands for several days. By September 15, it had organized into Tropical Depression Three-C, and quickly became a tropical storm that afternoon. The cyclone moved north-northwest for a day before slowing to a crawl for the next day. The cyclone turned southwest and weakened into a tropical depression due to vertical wind shear. It dissipated southwest of Hawaii near 13°N 162°W late on September 18.

Hurricane Olivia

The system drifted north-northwest, developing into a tropical storm that night. About 24 hours later, Olivia became a hurricane. Rapid intensification continued, and Olivia reached its peak intensity of 145 mph (230 km/h) winds around noon September 21, becoming the strongest storm of the season. The next day, waters under the tropical cyclone began to cool as the hurricane gained increasing latitude offshore Mexico. By noon on September 23, the cyclone had weakened into a tropical storm west of Baja California. Strong southwest flow to its north spread precipitation through the western United States into southwest Canada.

The heavy rain in California wiped out half of the raisin crop, a quarter of the wine crop, and a tenth of the tomato crop. Olivia's remnants brought rain totals of over 7 inches (177 mm) to California and northern Utah as they interacted with a strong upper level system and the local topography. The precipitation from this storm largely contributed to the record monthly precipitation in Salt Lake City, Utah, of 7.04 in (179 mm). These rains resulted in widespread losses, mainly from agriculture, amounting to $325 million (1982 USD).

Hurricane Paul 

The precursor disturbance to Paul originated from an area of low barometric pressure and disorganized thunderstorms, which was first noted near the Pacific coast of Nicaragua on September 15. Five days later, the EPHC classified it as Tropical Depression Twenty-Two. The depression turned northward and then moved inland near the El Salvador–Guatemala border, and dissipated overland. The remains of the depression retraced westward back over the open waters of the Pacific, briefly regenerating into a tropical depression. The depression again degenerated into an open trough on September 22. Two days later, Paul regenerated for the third time. It gradually organized into a tropical storm at 0000 UTC September 25. Two days later, Paul became a hurricane and turned north. As the storm neared Baja California Sur, it reached Category 2 intensity. On September 29, the hurricane crossed Baja California Sur at peak intensity. After weakening slightly inland, Paul made its final landfall near Los Mochis before rapidly dissipating overland.
 
The tropical depression that later became Paul produced the worst natural disaster in El Salvador since 1965. A total of 761 people were killed 312 of which occurred in San Salvador, which also sustained the worst damage. About 25,000–30,000 people were left homeless. In all, property damage from the storm amounted to $100 million (1982 US$) in the country; economic losses were estimated at $280 million (1982 USD). Crop damage was worth $250 million.

In Guatemala, widespread catastrophic floods claimed 615 lives and left 668 others missing. More than 10,000 people were left homeless as The 200 communities were isolated from surrounding areas. Overall, economic losses of $100 million (1982 USD) were reported in the country. In Nicaragua, Paul killed 71 people and caused $356 million (1982 USD) in economic losses. Throughout southern Mexico, floods from the precursor depression to Paul killed another 225 people. Prior to landfall in the state of Baja California Sur, 50,000 people were evacuated. Furthermore, wind gusts estimated at  swept through San José del Cabo, causing property damage and subsequently leaving 9,000 homeless. Despite extensive damage, no deaths were reported in the Baja California Peninsula wake of Paul. In northern Mexico, the greatest damage occurred 70 miles (110 km) south of Los Mochis in the city of Guamuchil; a total of 24 people were killed by the storm statewide, although it produced beneficial rains over the region. Agricultural damage was severe in the state of Sinaloa, with up to 40 percent of the soybean crop destroyed. In all, the state's corn production was down by 26 percent from the previous year. Total storm damage in Mexico amounted to $4.5 billion (1982 MXN; $70 million USD). The remnants of Paul moved into the United States, producing heavy rainfall in southern New Mexico and extreme West Texas. Inclement weather was observed as far inland as the Great Plains.

Tropical Storm Rosa 

A well-organized tropical depression formed in the Gulf of Tehuantepec on September 30. Moving slowly northwest, the system became a tropical storm, reaching maximum sustained winds of 50 mph (80 km/h) on the afternoon of October 2. The system slowly weakened as it moved northwest, and Rosa brushed the Pacific coast of Mexico as a dissipating depression.

Hurricane Sergio 

A tropical disturbance was noted southwest of Costa Rica on October 12. Moving west-northwest, the system organized into a tropical depression as it crossed the 91st meridian west late on October 13 and became a tropical storm by October 14 as it entered the Gulf of Tehuantepec. It strengthened into a hurricane late that day as it passed 95°W. By the afternoon of October 17, Sergio was packing sustained winds of 120 mph (190 km/h). Cooler water was reached soon afterwards, and weakening commenced. While slowly moving west, Sergio weakened to a tropical storm by the afternoon of October 21 and to a tropical depression late on October 22. The system dissipated near 19°N 133°W on the afternoon of October 23.

Tropical Storm Tara 

A tropical disturbance emerged off the coast of Central America. Staggering west-northwestward, the cyclone became a tropical storm by the morning of the October 22. Maximum sustained winds increased to 50 mph (80 km/h) late on October 24. As it moved over cooler waters on October 25, the system weakened to a tropical depression that afternoon, dissipating that night near 21°N 130°W.

Hurricane Iwa 

A late-season trough of low pressure developed into a tropical depression and was subsequently upgraded into Tropical Storm Iwa. At first, the After turning to the northeast, Iwa began to slowly intensify, and on November 23, Iwa strengthened into a hurricane. Iwa reached peak winds of  late on November 23. Accelerating, Iwa passed just north of the island of Kauai on November 24. After passing the island group, Iwa rapidly deteriorated; late on November 24, the hurricane degenerated into a tropical storm. On November 25, Iwa became an extratropical cyclone.

Due to the hurricane's rapid motion, storm surge extended 900 feet (275 m) inland. A total of 5,800 people were evacuated in Kauai. In addition, 44 of the 45 boats at Port Allen sunk. The worst of the damage from the hurricane occurred in Poipu and in areas where there was no protective barrier reef offshore. High winds from Hurricane Iwa briefly left Kauai without power and destroyed most papaya and banyan trees. The hurricane destroyed or damaged 3,890 homes on the island. Rough seas killed a person and left four others injured in Pearl Harbor. In Oahu, damage was heaviest on the southwest side of the island. The passage of the hurricane damaged at least 6,391 homes and 21 hotels; 418 buildings, including 30 businesses, were destroyed on Oahu. In Niihau, 20 homes were destroyed and 160 were damaged.

Throughout the Hawaiian island group, 20 people were treated for injuries. An estimated 500 people throughout Hawaii were left homeless due to the hurricane. At the time, Hurricane Iwa was the costliest storm to hit the state, with damage totaling $312 million (1982 USD, $  USD). Three days after Hurricane Iwa passed the state, Governor George Ariyoshi declared the islands of Kauai and Niihau as disaster areas with President Ronald Reagan following suit on November 28, declaring Kauai, Niihau, and Oahu as disaster areas. Furthermore, two people died in a traffic accident due to malfunctioning traffic lights. Ten years following the storm, Hurricane Iniki struck the same area.

Storm names 
The following names were used for named storms that formed in the eastern Pacific in 1982. No Eastern Pacific names were retired, so it was used again in the 1988 season. This is the same list used in the 1978 season, except for Fabio, which replaced Fico. A storm was named Fabio for the first time in 1982. Names that were not assigned are marked in gray.

Four names from the Central Pacific list were used – Akoni, Ema, Hana, and Iwa. This was the very first usage for all of these names. Akoni and Ema were used again in the 2019 season.

With four names being used, this season held the record for most named storms forming in the Central Pacific, until it was surpassed by the 2015 season.

Retirement 
One name was retired from the Central Pacific list after the 1982 season, Iwa. It was replaced with Io (which was later changed to Iona before its usage). Iwa is one of only four Central Pacific names to have been retired, the others being Iniki, Paka, and Ioke.

See also 

 List of Pacific hurricanes
 Pacific hurricane season
 1982 Atlantic hurricane season
 1982 Pacific typhoon season
 1982 North Indian Ocean cyclone season
 Australian cyclone seasons: 1981–82, 1982–83
 South Pacific cyclone seasons: 1981–82, 1982–83
 South-West Indian Ocean cyclone seasons: 1981–82, 1982–83
 Southern Hemisphere tropical cyclone seasons: 1981–82, 1982–83

References

External links 
 Eastern North Pacific Tropical Cyclones of 1982
 Unisys Weather archive for the Eastern Pacific, 1982
 CPHC Season Summary
 CLASS polar orbiter satellite archive

 
Pacific hurricane seasons
1982 EPac